Bert Greene (October 16, 1923June 10, 1988) was a cookbook author and food columnist. He was the food columnist for the New York Daily News from 1979 until his death in 1988. He was born in New York City.

He co-founded The Store in Amagansett, a gourmet take-out shop on Long Island, New York, in the Summer of 1966, with his then partner, Denis Vaughan and three friends, Jacqueline Allison a fashion illustrator, Ralph Rofheart an art director and advertising executive and his wife, Martha Rofheart a former actress.

His books include Greene on Greens, Honest American Fare, and The Grains Cookbook, all of which won the Tastemaker's Award.

The International Association of Culinary Professionals has a Food Journalism prize named in his honor.

Bibliography
   The Store Cookbook: Recipes and Recollection from The Store in Amagansett, 1974 
   Bert Greene's Kitchen bouquets: A cookbook of favored aromas and flavors, 1979
   Honest American Fare, 1984
   Greene on Greens, 1984
   The Grains Cookbook, 1989
   Bert Greene's Kitchen: A Book of Memories and Recipes, 1993

References

American food writers
American columnists
1923 births
1988 deaths
American cookbook writers
People from Long Island
20th-century American non-fiction writers
20th-century American male writers
James Beard Foundation Award winners
American male non-fiction writers